Catanduvas may refer to:
Catanduvas, Paraná, city in the Brazilian state of Paraná
Catanduvas, Santa Catarina, city in the Brazilian state of Santa Catarina

See also
Catanduva, a municipality in the state of São Paulo, Brazil